Faizan Sheikh is a Pakistani actor who appears in television series and films. He is known for appearances in numerous contrasting roles. He has played several genre roles including comical, romantic, antagonist and supporting roles. Currently, Shaikh is hosting The Mazedar Show on TV One and also appearing as a co-host with Faysal Qureshi on ARY Zindagi's morning show Salam Zindagi.

Career 
Faizan started his career as a model, and soon made his acting debut on television. He acted in theatre and gradually had roles in television. Sheikh played lead role in the play You Only Marry Twice. He performed the character of Yar Baloch in the play Lakhon main Teen. He also performed the lead of role of Romeo in the play "Sorry Juliet, Paaro loves Romeo".
 
He started his drama career by playing supporting role in Geo TV popular drama serial Mann Ke Moti.
He has also worked in drama serials such as Riffat Aapa ki Bahuein, and he also appeared in a lead role in Mera Naam Yousuf Hai, alongside Imran Abbas.
He was appreciated for his lead role as Pyaare in comedy sitcom Ready Steady Go .
He has also worked in a lead role in ARY Digital drama Main aur Tum 2.0. He also worked in another successful ARY Digital drama Mera Aangan.

Faizan Sheikh has also had roles in films, which include the role of Muneer in the film Maalik. The next year, he also played a role in the film Parchi.
Faizan is a co-host on ARY Zindagi's morning show Salam Zindagi. In 2018, he is playing the lead role of Sajid in the Geo Entertainment supernatural drama serial Saaya, along with Sohail Sameer He is currently hosting The Mazedar Show along with Aadi Adeel on TV One.

Personal life
Shaikh is the son of veteran television actress Parveen Akbar and brother of Rabya Kulsoom. He married co-actor Maham Aamir in 2018 with whom he has work in renowned comedy show Ready Steady Go. The couple became parents of a daughter in 2021.

Filmography

Film

Television

References

External links
Filmography of Muhammad Faizan Sheikh on IMDb website

Living people
Male actors from Karachi
Pakistani male television actors
Pakistani male film actors
Pakistani male stage actors
Year of birth missing (living people)
Pakistani male comedians